Robert Frederick Globke (born October 24, 1982) is an American former professional ice hockey player.

Biography
Globke was born in Farmington, Michigan, but grew up in West Bloomfield Township, Michigan. As a youth, he played in the 1996 Quebec International Pee-Wee Hockey Tournament with the Detroit Compuware minor ice hockey team.

Globke graduated from the University of Notre Dame and from Southfield Christian School. He was named as an All-Central Collegiate Hockey Association second team al-star in the 2003–04 season.

Globke played in the National Hockey League with the Florida Panthers with whom he was drafted 40th overall in the 2002 NHL Entry Draft. He last played for the Sheffield Steelers of the Elite Ice Hockey League.

Career statistics

Regular season and playoffs

International

References

External links

1982 births
Alumni of the University of Sheffield
American men's ice hockey right wingers
Florida Panthers draft picks
Florida Panthers players
Frederikshavn White Hawks players
Ice hockey players from Michigan
Krefeld Pinguine players
Living people
Notre Dame Fighting Irish men's ice hockey players
People from Farmington, Michigan
Rochester Americans players
San Antonio Rampage players
Sheffield Steelers players
Texas Wildcatters players
USA Hockey National Team Development Program players
People from West Bloomfield, Michigan